Custer is a surname. Notable people with the surname include:

Bob Custer (1898–1974), American film actor 
Boston Custer (1848–1876), brother of George Armstrong Custer
Clayton Custer (born 1995), American basketball player
Cole Custer (born 1998), American racing driver
Elizabeth Bacon Custer (1842–1933), wife of George Armstrong Custer
George Armstrong Custer (1839–1876), American Civil War general
Omer N. Custer (1873-1942), American politician
Thomas Custer (1845–1876), brother of George Armstrong Custer, two-time recipient of the U.S. Army Medal of Honor
Willard Ray Custer (1899–1985), inventor of channel wing airfoils